HMS Romola was an  destroyer which served with the Royal Navy during World War I. Launched on 14 May 1916, the ship operated as part of the Grand Fleet, operating as part of a destroyer flotilla. The ship sailed to intercept the German High Seas Fleet in what would be one of the last major expeditions of their Navy in the war but saw no action. After the conflict, the destroyer was held in reserve until being retired and sold to be broken up on 13 March 1930.

Design and development

Romola was one of seventeen  destroyers ordered by the British Admiralty in July 1915 as part of the Sixth War Construction Programme. A development of the preceding , the design differed primarily in utilising geared turbines to improve fuel consumption.

Three funnels were fitted.

Armament consisted of three  Mk IV QF guns on the ship's centreline, with one on the forecastle, one aft on a raised platform and one between the second and third funnels. A single 2-pounder (40 mm) pom-pom anti-aircraft gun was carried, while torpedo armament consisted of two rotating twin mounts for  torpedoes.  The ship had a complement of 82 officers and ratings.

Construction and career
Romola was laid down by John Brown & Company at Clydebank on the River Clyde on 25 August 1915 and launched on 14 May 1916, leaving the yard on 17 August that year. The destroyer was allocated the yard number 449. The build took 263 days and fitting out 96 days, the latter the longest of any of the class constructed at the yard. Despite that, Romola was the first of the order to enter service.

On commissioning, Romola joined the 11th Destroyer Flotilla of the Grand Fleet. On 24 April 1918 the Flotilla was called to intercept the High Seas Fleet on what was to prove the last major expedition by the German Navy during the War. The ships did not meet and no shots were fired in anger.

After the War, Romola was sent to Gibraltar along with sister-ship , arriving on 8 May 1920. Romola, as part of the Gibraltar Local Defence Flotilla, escorted the battlecruiser , carrying Edward, the Prince of Wales, into Gibraltar on 29 October 1921. From 1922, as part of a general demobilisation of the Royal Navy's local defence flotillas, Romola carried a reduced complement. In September 1922, as a result of the Chanak Crisis, which threatened war between Britain and Turkey, Romolas crew was made up to a full complement with men from the cruiser  and the destroyer, together with sister-ship  was ordered to Malta. The destroyer was subsequently recommissioned at Devonport and held in reserve. On 13 March 1930, the vessel was sold to King of Troon and broken up.

Pennant numbers

References

Citations

Bibliography

 
 
 
 
 
 
 

 
 
 
 

1916 ships
Ships built on the River Clyde
R-class destroyers (1916)
World War I destroyers of the United Kingdom